K. J. Gerard (born April 22, 1986, in Fountain Valley, California) is a former American football safety. He was signed by the Baltimore Ravens as an undrafted free agent in 2009. He played college football at Northern Arizona.

He has also been a member of the Chicago Bears and Miami Dolphins.

References

1986 births
Living people
American football safeties
Northern Arizona Lumberjacks football players
Miami Dolphins players
Baltimore Ravens players
Chicago Bears players